Mark Hartley is an Australian film maker. He is best known for the documentary Not Quite Hollywood: The Wild, Untold Story of Ozploitation! (2008) and the remake of Patrick (2013). He also wrote and directed the documentary film Electric Boogaloo: The Wild, Untold Story of Cannon Films.

Select filmography
 A Dream Within a Dream: The Making of 'Picnic at Hanging Rock''' (2004) (documentary)Not Quite Hollywood: The Wild, Untold Story of Ozploitation! (2008) (documentary)Machete Maidens Unleashed! (2010) (documentary)Patrick (2013)Electric Boogaloo: The Wild, Untold Story of Cannon Films (2014) (documentary)Girl at the Window'' (2022)

Awards and nominations

ARIA Music Awards
The ARIA Music Awards is an annual awards ceremony that recognises excellence, innovation, and achievement across all genres of Australian music. They commenced in 1987. 

! 
|-
| 1997
| Mark Hartley for "Good Mornin'" by You Am I
|rowspan="7" | Best Video
| 
|rowspan="7" |  
|-
| 1998
| Mark Hartley for "Takin' All Day" by The Cruel Sea
| 
|-
|rowspan="3" | 2000
| Mark Hartley for "Who the Hell Are You" by Madison Avenue
| 
|-
| Mark Hartley for "Don't Call Me Baby" by Madison Avenue
| 
|-
| Mark Hartley for "Poison" by Bardot
| 
|-
|rowspan="2" | 2001
| Mark Hartley for "He Don't Love You" by Human Nature
| 
|-
| Mark Hartley for "Chances Are" by Invertigo
| 
|-

References

External links

Excerpt from Electric Boogaloo on YouTube
Mark Hartley's official Vimeo channel
Interview on Den of Geek
Allmovie

Australian film directors
ARIA Award winners
Year of birth missing (living people)
Living people
Australian documentary filmmakers
Australian music video directors
The Cannon Group, Inc. people